Indobenthosuchus is an extinct genus of stereospondyl temnospondyl.

See also

 Prehistoric amphibian
 List of prehistoric amphibians

References

Stereospondyls
Prehistoric amphibian genera
Fossil taxa described in 1969